Total anterior circulation infarct (TACI) is a type of cerebral infarction affecting the entire anterior circulation supplying one side of the brain.

Total anterior circulation stroke syndrome (TACS) refers to the symptoms of a patient who clinically appears to have had a total anterior circulation infarct, but who has not yet had any diagnostic imaging (e.g. CT Scan) to confirm the diagnosis.

It is diagnosed when it causes all 3 of the following symptoms:
 Higher dysfunction
 Dysphasia
 Visuospatial disturbances
 Decreased level of consciousness
 Homonymous hemianopia
 Motor and Sensory Defects (≥2/3 of face, arm, leg)

For more information, see stroke.

External links 

Stroke